Trondheim Tramway Museum (Sporveismuseet i Trondheim) is a tram museum located in Trondheim, Norway. The museum offers in addition to a display of the tramway history of Trondheim also heritage trips with old trams on the sole remains of the tramway in Trondheim, Gråkallbanen. The museum has many heritage trams on display, several in working condition. The museum society was founded in 1979 and moved to its present location at the tramway depot at Munkvoll Station after the Trondheim Tramway was closed in 1988. The museum was opened in 1995, but is only open in the summer.

References

External links
 Museum web site

Museums in Trondheim
Museum
Railway museums in Norway
Buildings and structures in Trondheim
Tram museums